Kamešnica is a village in northern Croatia, located in the municipality of Kalnik, Koprivnica-Križevci County. The population is 188 (census 2011).

References

Populated places in Koprivnica-Križevci County